South Waziristan District was a district in Dera Ismail Khan Division of Khyber Pakhtunkhwa before splitting in to Lower South Waziristan District and Upper South Waziristan District and the southern part of Waziristan, a mountainous region of northwest Pakistan, that covers some 11,585 km2 (4,473 mi²). Waziristan comprises the area west and southwest of Peshawar between the Tochi River to the north and the Gomal River to the south. The region was an independent tribal territory from 1893, remaining outside of British-ruled empire and Afghanistan. Tribal raiding into British-ruled territory was a constant problem for the British, requiring frequent punitive expeditions between 1860 and 1945. Troops of the British Raj coined a name for this region "Hell's Door Knocker" in recognition of the fearsome reputation of the local fighters and inhospitable terrain. The capital city of South Waziristan is Wanna. South Waziristan is divided into the three administrative subdivisions of Ladha, Sarwakai, and Wanna. These three subdivisions are further divided into eight Tehsils: Ladha, Makin, Sararogha, Sarwakai, Tiarza, Wanna, Barmal, and Toi Khula.

The Waziristan was divided into two "agencies", North Waziristan and South Waziristan. The two parts have quite distinct characteristics, though both tribes are subgroups of the Waziri tribe, after whom the region is named, and speak a common Waziristani dialect. They have a reputation as warriors and are known for their frequent blood feuds. Traditionally, feuding local Waziri religious leaders have enlisted outsiders in the Pakistani government, and more recently U.S. forces hunting al-Qaeda fugitives—in attempts at score-settling. The tribes are divided into sub-tribes governed by male village elders who meet in a tribal jirga. Socially and religiously, Waziristan is an extremely conservative area. Women are carefully guarded, and every household must be headed by a male figure. Tribal cohesiveness is strong through so-called Collective Responsibility Acts in the Frontier Crimes Regulation.

In terms of area South Waziristan was the largest agency in FATA, being 6,619 km2. It has been functioning since 1895. In 2018, it became a district of Khyber Pakhtunkhwa, Pakistan with merger of FATA with Khyber Pakhtunkhwa. It is bordered to the north by the North Waziristan District, to the north-east by Bannu and Lakki Marwat Districts, to the east by tribal areas adjoining the Tank and Dera Ismail Khan Districts, to the south by Zhob District of Balochistan Province and tribal areas adjoining Dera Ismail Khan District, and to the west by Afghanistan.

Corruption at Angor Ada,which is a  trade corridor, is rampant   Deforestation is on its apogee. 

On April 13, 2022, South Waziristan was bifurcated into Upper South Waziristan district and Lower South Waziristan district. Upper South Waziristan district comprises Ladha, Makin, Tayyarzai, Sarokai and Shawal tehsils with Spinkai Rakhzai as its headquarters, while Lower South Waziristan district consist of Wana, Shakai, Loi Khwla and Birmil tehsils with Wana as its headquarters.

History

Located near the site of the ancient Indus Valley civilization and Harappa, the region was annexed as part of a far flung satrapy by the old Persian Achaemenid Empire before 500 B.C. The Macedonians under Alexander the Great marched on the area around 330 B.C., the later Greco-Bactrians establishing an independent Indo-Greek Kingdom following a split with the Seleucid Empire to the west. Afterwards, it came under Mauryan rule. The Saka arrived around 97 B.C., before the Indo-Parthians of Arsacid affinity ruled under Gondophares to about A.D. 75. The following few centuries A.D. brought at least nominal Kushan, Ephthalite, Kidarite and Sassanian Persian rule, the last of which fell to the forces of the Arab Rashidun Caliphate, which introduced Islam to the East Iranian borderlands in the seventh century. Islam was spread further east under the Saffarid dynasty which, under Ya'qub-i Laith Saffari, pressed deep into the Khyber hinterlands. The succeeding centuries saw Ghaznavid, Ghorid, and Babar control of the area, where regional Pashtoon tribes living in and around the Hindu-Kush later battled the encroaching British India northwest of the Punjab. From then onward, the region remained under British Indian Empire rule after the 1893 Durand Line agreement, until the state of Pakistan was created.

Up to 1895, the Deputy Commissioner of  Dera Ismail Khan and Bannu had controlled all political matters in Waziristan since the taking over of the Frontier from the Sikhs. These areas did not come under British control until November 1893, when the Amir of Afghanistan signed a treaty renouncing all claims to these territories. After an attack on the Delimitation Commission Escort at Wanna in 1894 and subsequent large military operations in 1894–95, a Political Agent for South Waziristan was permanently appointed with its headquarters at Wanna; another was appointed for the Tochi area (North Waziristan) with headquarters at Miramshah. The post of Resident in Waziristan was created in 1908. The Political Agent in North Waziristan was subordinate to the Resident, who was directly responsible to the Chief Commissioner of North Western Frontier Province. With the withdrawal of Indian government to the settled districts, the regular armed forces were withdrawn and, instead, a local militia was raised in 1900. However, large scale disturbances occurred in 1904 resulting in the murder of the Political Agent and Militia Commandant at Sarwakai. Later, a plot to murder all the British officers, seize the Wanna fort; and hand it over to Mullah Powindah, the self-styled king of Waziristan, was discovered. The Political Agent and the Commandant, on the same night, disarmed and dismissed all the Mahsuds from the Militia. A few months later, they were again enlisted, but were once again disbanded in 1906. In 1925 the Royal Air Force pacified Mahsud tribesmen by means of the Pink's War bombing campaign.

In the 20th century, Mirzali Khan (Faqir of Ipi), although based in Gurwek, North Waziristan, had also many followers from South Waziristan.

Geography

The Agency is mostly a mass of rugged and complex hills and ridges. There are no regular mountain alignments. The land rises gradually from south and east to north and west. The dominating range is the Preghal in the west along the border with Afghanistan. It is the highest peak which is 3,515 metres high. Zarmelan, Wanna, Shakki, Zalai, Spin and Tiarza are the main plains of the Agency.

Direction of water courses, in general, is from west to south i.e. from the watersheds of Sulaiman Mountains to the Indus. There are two principal rivers in the Agency, Gomal of Luni and Tank Zam. Some important rivulets are Khaisora, Shaktu, Siplatoi, Toi Khwla, Shuza, Shinkai and Shahur. The rest are mountain streams which can become dangerous and impassable during heavy rains which frequently occur during the months of July and August. The Gomal River rises in two branches in the eastern slopes of the western Sulaiman range in the Barmal District of Afghanistan not far from the source of the Tochi River. The Tank Zam is formed by the junction of the Tauda China and the Baddar Toi, at Dwa Toi, south of Razmak.

Administration 

South Waziristan District is currently subdivided into eight Tehsils.

 Birmil Tehsil
 Ladha Tehsil
 Makin Tehsil
 Sararogha Tehsil
 Serwekai Tehsil
 Tiarza Tehsil
 Toi Khulla Tehsil
 Wana Tehsil

Climate
The Agency has hot summers and very cold winters. In winter, temperatures go below freezing point in places of high altitude. The summer season starts in May and ends by September. June is generally the warmest month when the mean maximum temperature rises slightly over 30 degrees Celsius. The winter starts in October and continues until April. December, January and February are the coldest months. The mean maximum and minimum temperatures for this period are 10 and −2 degrees Celsius, respectively. The Agency is outside the monsoon zone, yet at higher altitudes a fair amount of rainfall is received. South Waziristan Agency has an arid climate, receiving minimal precipitation. The western portion, bordering Afghanistan, receives more rainfall than the eastern portion touching Tank and D.I.Khan districts due to high altitude.

Demographics

At the time of the 2017 census the district had a population of 675,215, of which 355,611 were males and 319,554 females. The population was entirely rural. The literacy rate was 34.46% - the male literacy rate was 50.43% while the female literacy rate was 16.59%. 362 people in the district were from religious minorities. Pashto was the predominant language, spoken by 96.55% of the population.

The two main tribes of the agency are the Ahmadzai Wazir and the Mahsud. The other significant tribal populations are the Ormur (Burki or Baraki), Dotani, Sulaimankhel, Ghilji, Khomia and Taji. Some Bettani tribal people live in a strip on the south-east border, while the Ghilji are mainly settled in the south-west corner. The Dotani and Sulaimankhel tribes mainly live in Toi Khwla and Gulkuch.

Dress and ornaments
The tribal people of this area wear distinctive dress. The dress of men consists of a turban smock; Shalwar and Chaddar. The smock is generally white or grey and occasionally embroidered on the chest with silk or cotton. Their Shalwars are baggy and big. Maliks and the wealthy wear white cotton smocks and carry Chaddar on their shoulders. The young educated males wear modern dress as worn by people elsewhere in the country. Women wear different colored clothes as to be identified. Married women put on dark-blue or dark-red smocks of coarse cotton. The spinsters invariably of both married and unmarried women are similar and fit closely below the knee.  The married women usually wear a very huge firak called "ganr khat". The unmarried wear simple shalwar and qamees. One can easily differentiate between married and unmarried by this firak.
Currently trends are changing of people and they adopt the new culture as well. in wazir etan the trend is slowly emerging but those people who migrated to other Urban areas of Pakistan they changed the fashion and also adopt the other culture. these tribe consist mainly on Mehsud and Wazir tribe. but still two main tribe of wazir e stan not change the way of living and they prefer the simplicity and traditional life ( Dotani and Suleman Khel tribe).

Food
The people of South Waziristan eat simple food of wheat and maize bread. They are also fond of chai (tea) and rice cooked with mutton. Pulao, a rice pilaf, with roasted meat are served on special occasions. But the main one is Sohbat of Mahsud tribals. The famous food of Dotani and suleman khel tribe is "Korrat", the half white rice mix up with "ghee" which is made from cow milk and second is Bar be Q of Goat.

Economy
The majority of Wazirs Mahsuds, Dotani and  suleimankhail of South Waziristan are pastoral. The Wazirs breed cows and sheep and earn their livelihood from sheep-rearing. Suleimankhail are also horses and sheep and some go to different parts of Punjab in summers and most of them are in Iran to earn their livelihood. A large number of Mahsuds are employed in the Army, as levies and Khassadars in militia and scouts. Mahsuds have also taken to business in Tank and Dera Ismail Khan driving buses and trucks. The Agency also produces or trades charcoal, wool, potatoes, chilghozas and a few varieties of locally grown fruit.

Mining
There is hardly significant mining to be mentioned. Coal mines have been discovered in the Wazir area of Neeli Kach Tehsil Wanna. Copper is found in Preghal and Spin Kamar. Chromite in area Sarah Khuara near Dre Nashter.

Places of interest
Wanna is the summer headquarters of the Agency.The Historic Gomal Pass is mentioned by a famous diplomats and writer Dr Shamshad as a entery point of the Shahab- u- Din Ghouri's attacking army in 1192 AD. Ghouris travelled through south Waziristan and attacked india. Moreover, Musa Qala fort or the house of Pir Bagdadi near WANA bazar is also important place in SWD. Likewise, the check posts of British army built on various immensely tall mountains give evidence of the expertise of British army. The Red Bridge,locally known as seer Pall , at Tiarza is a remarkable sign of UK construction in the region.The Village Ghowa Khawa is also a very important place. Ali wazir who is the MNA and leader of PTM belongs to this village . Besides, famous lawyers of SWD Bar like Advocate Fida Hussain wazir were born here in Ghowa Khawa.

It is an important tehsil and a camp similar to Razmak. The population is mostly of Ahmadzai Wazirs. It has a vast plain with extensive valleys surrounded on all sides by hills. It is an important industrial and agricultural center. Khaisur, Osspass, karama, Ladha, Makin, Sararogha, Azamwarsak and Angur Ada are also important places of the Agency. Kaniguram is inhabited principally by a tribe called Burki. There are some Mahsuds who also live there but no others. Recently in a local clash the Malik din Khel clan of Mahsuds annexed many parts of Burkis on which the Malik Din Khels have built their own houses. The tribesmen manufacture small arms and knives, which are most known for their finish and performance and much-liked by tourists and foreigners.

Administration
The civil administration of South Waziristan Agency has been functioning since 1895 under a Political Agent who administers civil criminal and revenue cases in accordance with the Frontier Crimes Regulations and Customary Law. The Agency is divided into the three administrative subdivisions of Ladha, Sarwakai, and Wanna. These three subdivisions are further divided into eight Tehsils: Ladha, Makin, Sararogha, Sarwakai, Tiarza, Wanna, Barmal, and Toi Khwla.

The subdivision of Sarwakai is administered by Assistant Political Officer, whereas the subdivisions of Ladha and Wanna are administered by Assistant Political Agents. Each tehsil is headed by a Political Naib Tehsildar. The Malik system introduced by the British government is functioning Agency. Maliks used to work like media between administrations and the (Qaum) or Tribe. A Maliki is hereditary and devolves on the son and his son so on and so forth for which regular benefits and subsidies are sanctioned from time to time. Lungi system known as Sufaid Resh is slightly lower form of Maliki.

Provincial Assembly

Pakistan's new Waziristan strategy
On June 4, 2007, the National Security Council of Pakistan met to decide the fate of Waziristan and take up a number of political and administrative decisions to control "Talibanization" of the area. The meeting was chaired by President Pervez Musharraf and it was attended by the Chief Ministers and Governors of all four provinces. They discussed the deteriorating law and order situation and the threat posed to state security.

The government decided to take a number of actions to stop the "Talibanization" and crush the armed militancy in the Tribal regions and Khyber-Pakhtunkhwa.

The NSC of Pakistan has decided the following actions will be taken to achieve the goals:
 Deployment of unmanned reconnaissance planes
 Strengthening law enforcement agencies with advanced equipment
 Deployment of more troops to the region
 Operations against militants on fast-track basis
 Focused operations against militant commanders
 Action against madrasahs preaching militancy
 Appointment of regional coordinators
 Fresh recruitment of police officers in Khyber-Pakhtunkhwa

The Ministry of Interior has played a large part in the information gathering for the operations against militants and their institutions. The Ministry of Interior has prepared a list of militant commanders operating in the region and they have also prepared a list of seminaries for monitoring.

The government is also trying to strengthen the law enforcement in the area by providing Khyber-Pakhtunkhwa Police with weapons, bulletproof jackets and night-vision devices. The paramilitary Frontier Corps will be provided with artillery and Armored Personnel Carriers (APCs). The state agencies are also studying ways to block broadcasting of illegal FM radio channels.

A major military offensive was launched in the area by the Pakistani army on 17 October 2009. ISPR on 2 November told the media about involvement of Indian's in South Waziristan had been found.

The Taliban has been dislodged from the area. However, reports that appeared in 2012 suggested that only one out of six subdivisions has been de-notified as conflict zone. Army has control over the main roads and strategic hilltops while TTP militants have safe havens in the valleys.

See also
 Battle of Wanna
 Dera Ismail Khan Division
 Bannu District
 North Waziristan District

References

External links

  This includes an Empire-centric view of the politics and demographics.
 Waziristan and Mughal empire
 Nehru in Waziristan
 Sketch map of Waziristan
 Mehsuds and Wazirs, the King-makers in a game of thrones
 Lawrence of Arabia in Waziristan

Waziristan
 
Districts of Khyber Pakhtunkhwa
Districts of Pakistan
Historic districts in Pakistan